"Live It Up" is a debut song recorded by American country music group Marshall Dyllon.  It was released in September 2000 as the first single from the album Enjoy the Ride.  The song reached No. 37 on the Billboard Hot Country Singles & Tracks chart.  The song was written and produced by Phil Vassar and Robert Byrne.

Critical reception
A review in Billboard of the song was favorable, praising the "great uptempo melody, a solid performance, and a positive, well-written lyric".

Personnel
 Robert Byrne - acoustic guitar
 Mike Durham - electric guitar
 Shannon Forrest - drums
 Paul Franklin - steel guitar
 Aubrey Haynie - fiddle
 Kevin Haynie - banjo
 Steve Nathan - piano, keyboards
 Chuck Tilley - percussion
 Glenn Worf - bass guitar

Chart performance

Notes

References

2000 debut singles
2000 songs
Marshall Dyllon songs
Songs written by Robert Byrne (songwriter)
Songs written by Phil Vassar